The candle hap (Stigmatochromis pholidophorus) is a species of cichlid endemic to Lake Malawi where it can be found hunting for prey over sandy areas.  It can reach a length of 10.8|cm.  TL.  It can also be found in the aquarium trade.

References

Candle hap
Taxonomy articles created by Polbot
Fish described in 1935